Fairmont is a town in Garfield County, Oklahoma, United States. The population was 134 at the 2010 census, a decrease from 147 at the 2000 census.

History
Patterson Township, which surrounds Fairmont, began to be settled in 1893, immediately after the opening of the Cherokee Outlet. The Denver, Enid and Gulf Railroad constructed a line through area in 1902. The Enid Right of Way and Townsite Company platted Fairmont on October 18, 1902. A post office was established in December of that year. Previously, residents had received mail at the Luella post office. The Arkansas Valley and Western Railway constructed a branch from Tulsa through Perry and Covington to Steen (northeast of Enid) in 1902–03. The two railroads crossed at Fairmont, making the town a hub of agricultural services. Two elevators were built along the Frisco and two along the Santa Fe.

Agriculture has been the primary economic base for Fairmont since its founding. The principal crop is wheat. Petroleum bolstered the town after oil was discovered in the county in 1916. An oil refinery was built near Fairmont. It was acquired by the Champlin Refining Company in 1925.

Geography
Fairmont is located at  (36.355411, -97.704931).

Demographics 

As of the census of 2000, there were 147 people, 58 households, and 41 families residing in the town. There were 66 housing units at an average density of 233.1 per square mile (91.0/km2). The racial makeup of the town was 97.96% White, 2.04% from other races. Hispanic or Latino of any race were 4.76% of the population.

There were 58 households, out of which 29.3% had children under the age of 18 living with them, 67.2% were married couples living together, 3.4% had a female householder with no husband present, and 29.3% were non-families. 29.3% of all households were made up of individuals, and 15.5% had someone living alone who was 65 years of age or older. The average household size was 2.53 and the average family size was 3.12.

In the town, the population was spread out, with 25.2% under the age of 18, 6.8% from 18 to 24, 29.3% from 25 to 44, 24.5% from 45 to 64, and 14.3% who were 65 years of age or older. The median age was 38 years. For every 100 females, there were 116.2 males. For every 100 females age 18 and over, there were 86.4 males.

The median income for a household in the town was $39,375, and the median income for a family was $43,750. Males had a median income of $31,750 versus $25,417 for females. The per capita income for the town was $18,111. There were 9.5% of families and 5.8% of the population living below the poverty line, including no under eighteens and none of those over 64.

Education
Its school district is Garber Public Schools.

Notes

References

External links
 Encyclopedia of Oklahoma History and Culture - Fairmont

Towns in Garfield County, Oklahoma
Towns in Oklahoma
1902 establishments in Oklahoma Territory